Splendrillia interpunctata is a species of sea snail, a marine gastropod mollusk in the family Drilliidae.

Description
The length of the shell varies between 7 mm and 16.5 mm.

Distribution
This species occurs in the Caribbean Sea.

References

   Smith, E.A. (1882) Diagnoses of new species of Pleurotomidae in the British Museum. Annals and Magazine of Natural History, series 5, 10, 206–218
 Fallon P.J. (2016). Taxonomic review of tropical western Atlantic shallow water Drilliidae (Mollusca: Gastropoda: Conoidea) including descriptions of 100 new species. Zootaxa. 4090(1): 1–363

External links
 
  Tucker, J.K. 2004 Catalog of recent and fossil turrids (Mollusca: Gastropoda). Zootaxa 682:1–1295.

interpunctata
Gastropods described in 1882